Gov. Faustino N. Dy, Sr. Memorial Hospital (GFNDSMH) is a government-operated hospital located at Calamagui 2nd, Ilagan, Isabela, created by virtue of an act of the Philippine National Assembly in 1939. It is a 100 to 200-bed capacity secondary hospital operated by the provincial government of Isabela.

The hospital has Level II accreditation from the Philippine Health Insurance Corporation.

References

Hospitals in the Philippines
1939 establishments in the Philippines